Nassandres is a former commune in the Eure department in Normandy in northern France. On 1 January 2017, it was merged into the new commune Nassandres sur Risle.

Population

Sights
The church of Saint-André was built in the 12th century and enlarged in the 16th century. The sacristy was built in the 17th century.

See also
Communes of the Eure department

References

External links

Nassandres on les communes de France (French)
official site (French)

Former communes of Eure